Taken B-Side is an unofficial or bootleg compilation album by the German rock band Scorpions, released in 2009. It contains songs that were released only as bonus tracks of certain studio albums and includes new recordings, cover versions, live tracks and B-sides of some singles. Two of the tracks are not in the rock genre and were not performed by the band. One of them was based on a poem and it involved only the lead vocalist.

Track list

Track details
Disc 1

Disc 2

Personnel
Band members

Past members

Additional musicians

On "Edge of Time", "You and I" (single edit) and "When You Came Into My Life":

On "Heroes Don't Cry":

On "Alex & Julie's Love Theme":

On "You and I" (single edit) and "When You Came Into My Life":

On "You and I" (both single edit and "Butcher" radio mix), "She's Knocking at My Door" and "Kiss of Borrowed Time":

On "You and I" ("Butcher" radio mix):

On "White Dove":

On "Veter peremen" and "Viento de cambio":

On "Humanity" (radio edit):

On "You Are the Champion":

On "Marie's the Name (His Latest Flame)":

On "Rhythm of Love" and "Back to You":

On "Fuchs geh' voran":

On "We Don't Own the World":

On "Bis wohin reicht mein Leben":

References

External links 

2009 compilation albums
Scorpions (band) compilation albums
Sony BMG compilation albums